Fortis may refer to:

Business 
 Fortis AG, a Swiss watch company
 Fortis Films, an American film and television production company founded by actress and producer Sandra Bullock
 Fortis Healthcare, a chain of hospitals in India
 Fortis Inc., a Canadian utility holding company
 Fortis Group, a defunct banking, financial services, and insurance company, based in Belgium and The Netherlands or their successors:
 Ageas, formed from the insurance operations of Fortis
 ASR Nederland, formed from the Dutch insurance operations of Fortis
 BNP Paribas Fortis, formed from the Belgian banking operations of Fortis, now owned by BNP Paribas
 ABN AMRO, formed from the Netherlands banking operations of Fortis, now owned by the Dutch government

People 
 Alberto Fortis (1741–1803), Venetian writer, naturalist and cartographer
 Alberto Fortis (musician) (born 1955), Italian singer and songwriter
 Alessandro Fortis (1842–1909), Italian politician and prime minister
 Jean-Baptiste-Boniface de Fortis (1746–1836), French politician
 Louis Fortis (born 1947), American politician
 Luigi Fortis (1748–1829), Italian Jesuit 
 Rami Fortis (born 1954), Israeli rock musician

Other 
 Fortis (aerojeep), a propelled ground vehicle
 Fortis (linguistics), consonants produced with greater energy than lenis ones
 Mitsubishi Galant Fortis, a compact car also known as the Mitsubishi Lancer
 Fortis College

See also
 Aqua fortis